Plan 9 from Bell Labs is a distributed operating system which originated from the Computing Science Research Center (CSRC) at Bell Labs in the mid-1980s and built on UNIX concepts first developed there in the late 1960s. Since 2000, Plan 9 has been free and open-source. The final official release was in early 2015.

Under Plan 9, UNIX's everything is a file metaphor is extended via a pervasive network-centric filesystem, and the cursor-addressed, terminal-based I/O at the heart of UNIX-like operating systems is replaced by a windowing system and graphical user interface without cursor addressing, although rc, the Plan 9 shell, is text-based.

The name Plan 9 from Bell Labs is a reference to the Ed Wood 1957 cult science fiction Z-movie Plan 9 from Outer Space. The system continues to be used and developed by operating system researchers and hobbyists.

History 

Plan 9 from Bell Labs was originally developed, starting in the late 1980s, by members of the Computing Science Research Center at Bell Labs, the same group that originally developed Unix and the C programming language. The Plan 9 team was initially led by Rob Pike, Ken Thompson, Dave Presotto and Phil Winterbottom, with support from Dennis Ritchie as head of the Computing Techniques Research Department.  Over the years, many notable developers have contributed to the project, including Brian Kernighan, Tom Duff, Doug McIlroy, Bjarne Stroustrup and Bruce Ellis.

Plan 9 replaced Unix as Bell Labs's primary platform for operating systems research. It explored several changes to the original Unix model that facilitate the use and programming of the system, notably in distributed multi-user environments. After several years of development and internal use, Bell Labs shipped the operating system to universities in 1992. Three years later, Plan 9 was made available for commercial parties by AT&T via the book publisher Harcourt Brace. With source licenses costing $350, AT&T targeted the embedded systems market rather than the computer market at large. Ritchie commented that the developers did not expect to do "much displacement" given how established other operating systems had become.

By early 1996, the Plan 9 project had been "put on the back burner" by AT&T in favor of Inferno, intended to be a rival to Sun Microsystems' Java platform.
In the late 1990s, Bell Labs' new owner Lucent Technologies dropped commercial support for the project and in 2000, a third release was distributed under an open-source license. A fourth release under a new free software license occurred in 2002. In early 2015, the final official release of Plan 9 occurred.

A user and development community, including current and former Bell Labs personnel, produced minor daily releases in the form of ISO images. Bell Labs hosted the development. The development source tree is accessible over the 9P and HTTP protocols and is used to update existing installations. In addition to the official components of the OS included in the ISOs, Bell Labs also hosts a repository of externally developed applications and tools.

As Bell Labs has moved on to later projects in recent years, development of the official Plan 9 system had stopped. On March 23, 2021, development resumed following the transfer of copyright from Bell Labs to the Plan 9 Foundation. Unofficial development for the system also continues on the 9front fork, where active contributors provide monthly builds and new functionality. So far, the 9front fork has provided the system Wi-Fi drivers, Audio drivers, USB support and built-in game emulator, along with other features. Other recent Plan 9-inspired operating systems include Harvey OS and Jehanne OS.

Design concepts 

Plan 9 is a distributed operating system, designed to make a network of heterogeneous and geographically separated computers function as a single system. In a typical Plan 9 installation, users work at terminals running the window system rio, and they access CPU servers which handle computation-intensive processes. Permanent data storage is provided by additional network hosts acting as file servers and archival storage.

Its designers state that,

The first idea (a per-process name space) means that, unlike on most operating systems, processes (running programs) each have their own view of the namespace, corresponding to what other operating systems call the file system; a single path name may refer to different resources for different processes. The potential complexity of this setup is controlled by a set of conventional locations for common resources.

The second idea (a message-oriented filesystem) means that processes can offer their services to other processes by providing virtual files that appear in the other processes' namespace. The client process's input/output on such a file becomes inter-process communication between the two processes. This way, Plan 9 generalizes the Unix notion of the filesystem as the central point of access to computing resources. It carries over Unix's idea of device files to provide access to peripheral devices (mice, removable media, etc.) and the possibility to mount filesystems residing on physically distinct filesystems into a hierarchical namespace, but adds the possibility to mount a connection to a server program that speaks a standardized protocol and treat its services as part of the namespace.

For example, the original window system, called 8½, exploited these possibilities as follows. The window system thus receives all input and output commands from the program and handles these appropriately, by sending output to the actual screen device and giving the currently focused program the keyboard and mouse input. The program does not need to know if it is communicating directly with the operating system's device drivers, or with the window system; it only has to assume that its namespace is set up so that these special files provide the kind of input and accept the kind of messages that it expects.

Plan 9's distributed operation relies on the per-process namespaces as well, allowing client and server processes to communicate across machines in the way just outlined. For example, the  command starts a remote session on a computation server. The command exports part of its local namespace, including the user's terminal's devices, to the server, so that remote programs can perform input/output using the terminal's mouse, keyboard and display, combining the effects of remote login and a shared network filesystem.

9P protocol 

All programs that wish to provide services-as-files to other programs speak a unified protocol, called 9P. Compared to other systems, this reduces the number of custom programming interfaces. 9P is a generic, medium-agnostic, byte-oriented protocol that provides for messages delivered between a server and a client. The protocol is used to refer to and communicate with processes, programs, and data, including both the user interface and the network. With the release of the 4th edition, it was modified and renamed 9P2000.

Unlike most other operating systems, Plan 9 does not provide special application programming interfaces (such as Berkeley sockets, X resources or ioctl system calls) to access devices. Instead, Plan 9 device drivers implement their control interface as a file system, so that the hardware can be accessed by the ordinary file input/output operations read and write. Consequently, sharing the device across the network can be accomplished by mounting the corresponding directory tree to the target machine.

Union directories and namespaces 
Plan 9 allows the user to collect the files (called names) from different directory trees in a single location. The resulting union directory behaves as the concatenation of the underlying directories (the order of concatenation can be controlled); if the constituent directories contain files having the same name, a listing of the union directory ( or ) will simply report duplicate names.

A union directory can be created by using the  command:

; bind /arm/bin /bin
; bind -a /acme/bin/arm /bin
; bind -b /usr/alice/bin /bin

Acme's  directory is then union mounted after , and Alice's personal  directory is union mounted before.

The separate process namespaces thus usually replace the notion of a search path in the shell. Unlike in Plan 9, the path environment variable of Unix shells should be set to include the additional directories whose executable files need to be added as commands.

Furthermore, the kernel can keep separate mount tables for each process, and can thus provide each process with its own file system namespace. Processes' namespaces can be constructed independently, and the user may work simultaneously with programs that have heterogeneous namespaces. Namespaces may be used to create an isolated environment similar to chroot, but in a more secure way.

Plan 9's union directory architecture inspired 4.4BSD and Linux union file system implementations, although the developers of the BSD union mounting facility found the non-recursive merging of directories in Plan 9 "too restrictive for general purpose use".

Special virtual filesystem

/proc 

Instead of having system calls specifically for process management, Plan 9 provides the  file system. Each process appears as a directory containing information and control files which can be manipulated by the ordinary file IO system calls.

The file system approach allows Plan 9 processes to be managed with simple file management tools such as ls and cat; however, the processes cannot be copied and moved as files.

/net 
Plan 9 does not have specialised system calls or ioctls for accessing the networking stack or networking hardware. Instead, the  file system is used. Network connections are controlled by reading and writing control messages to control files.

Unicode 

To reduce the complexity of managing character encodings, Plan 9 uses Unicode throughout the system. The initial Unicode implementation was ISO/IEC 10646-1:1993. Ken Thompson invented UTF-8, which became the native encoding in Plan 9. The entire system was converted to general use in 1992. UTF-8 preserves backwards compatibility with traditional null-terminated strings, enabling more reliable information processing and the chaining of multilingual string data with Unix pipes between multiple processes.  Using a single UTF-8 encoding with characters for all cultures and regions eliminates the need for switching between code sets.

Combining the design concepts 
Though interesting on their own, the design concepts of Plan 9 were supposed to be most useful when combined. For example, to implement a network address translation (NAT) server, a union directory can be created, overlaying the router's  directory tree with its own . Similarly, a virtual private network (VPN) can be implemented by overlaying in a union directory a  hierarchy from a remote gateway, using secured 9P over the public Internet. A union directory with the  hierarchy and filters can be used to sandbox an untrusted application or to implement a firewall. In the same manner, a distributed computing network can be composed with a union directory of  hierarchies from remote hosts, which allows interacting with them as if they are local.

When used together, these features allow for assembling a complex distributed computing environment by reusing the existing hierarchical name system.

Software for Plan 9 

As a benefit from the system's design, most tasks in Plan 9 can be accomplished by using ls, cat, grep, cp and rm utilities in combination with the rc shell (the default Plan 9 shell).

Factotum is an authentication and key management server for Plan 9. It handles authentication on behalf of other programs such that both secret keys and implementation details need only be known to Factotum.

Graphical programs 

Unlike Unix, Plan 9 was designed with graphics in mind. After booting, a Plan 9 terminal will run the rio windowing system, in which the user can create new windows displaying rc. Graphical programs invoked from this shell replace it in its window.

The plumber provides an inter-process communication mechanism which allows system-wide hyperlinking.

Sam and acme are Plan 9's text editors.

Storage system 
Plan 9 supports the Kfs, Paq, Cwfs, FAT, and Fossil file systems. The last was designed at Bell Labs specifically for Plan 9 and provides snapshot storage capability. It can be used directly with a hard drive or backed with Venti, an archival file system and permanent data storage system.

Software development 
The distribution package for Plan 9 includes special compiler variants and programming languages, and provides a tailored set of libraries along with a windowing user interface system specific to Plan 9. The bulk of the system is written in a dialect of C (ANSI C with some extensions and some other features left out). The compilers for this language were custom built with portability in mind; according to their author, they "compile quickly, load slowly, and produce medium quality object code".

A concurrent programming language called Alef was available in the first two editions, but was then dropped for maintenance reasons and replaced by a threading library for C.

Unix compatibility 
Though Plan 9 was supposed to be a further development of Unix concepts, compatibility with preexisting Unix software was never the goal for the project. Many command-line utilities of Plan 9 share the names of Unix counterparts, but work differently.

Plan 9 can support POSIX applications and can emulate the Berkeley socket interface through the ANSI/POSIX Environment (APE) that implements an interface close to ANSI C and POSIX, with some common extensions (the native Plan 9 C interfaces conform to neither standard). It also includes a POSIX-compatible shell. APE's authors claim to have used it to port the X Window System (X11) to Plan 9, although they do not ship X11 "because supporting it properly is too big a job". Some Linux binaries can be used with the help of a "linuxemu" (Linux emulator) application; however, it is still a work in progress. Vice versa, the vx32 virtual machine allows a slightly modified Plan 9 kernel to run as a user process in Linux, supporting unmodified Plan 9 programs.

Reception

Comparison to contemporary operating systems 
In 1991, Plan 9's designers compared their system to other early nineties operating systems in terms of size, showing that the source code for a minimal ("working, albeit not very useful") version was less than one-fifth the size of a Mach microkernel without any device drivers (5899 or 4622 lines of code for Plan 9, depending on metric, vs. 25530 lines). The complete kernel comprised 18000 lines of code. (According to a 2006 count, the kernel was then some 150,000 lines, but this was compared against more than 4.8 million in Linux.)

Within the operating systems research community, as well as the commercial Unix world, other attempts at achieving distributed computing and remote filesystem access were made concurrently with the Plan 9 design effort. These included the Network File System and the associated vnode architecture developed at Sun Microsystems, and more radical departures from the Unix model such as the Sprite OS from UC Berkeley. Sprite developer Brent Welch points out that the SunOS vnode architecture is limited compared to Plan 9's capabilities in that it does not support remote device access and remote inter-process communication cleanly, even though it could have, had the preexisting UNIX domain sockets (which "can essentially be used to name user-level servers") been integrated with the vnode architecture.

One critique of the "everything is a file", communication-by-textual-message design of Plan 9 pointed out limitations of this paradigm compared to the typed interfaces of Sun's object-oriented operating system, Spring:

A later retrospective comparison of Plan 9, Sprite and a third contemporary distributed research operating system, Amoeba, found that

Impact 

Plan 9 demonstrated that an integral concept of Unix—that every system interface could be represented as a set of files—could be successfully implemented in a modern distributed system. Some features from Plan 9, like the UTF-8 character encoding of Unicode, have been implemented in other operating systems. Unix-like operating systems such as Linux have implemented 9P2000, Plan 9's protocol for accessing remote files, and have adopted features of rfork, Plan 9's process creation mechanism. Additionally, in Plan 9 from User Space, several of Plan 9's applications and tools, including the sam and acme editors, have been ported to Unix and Linux systems and have achieved some level of popularity. Several projects seek to replace the GNU operating system programs surrounding the Linux kernel with the Plan 9 operating system programs. The 9wm window manager was inspired by 8½, the older windowing system of Plan 9; wmii is also heavily influenced by Plan 9.
In computer science research, Plan 9 has been used as a grid computing platform and as a vehicle for research into ubiquitous computing without middleware.
In commerce, Plan 9 underlies Coraid storage systems.
However, Plan 9 has never approached Unix in popularity, and has been primarily a research tool:

Other factors that contributed to low adoption of Plan 9 include the lack of commercial backup, the low number of end-user applications, and the lack of device drivers.

Plan 9 proponents and developers claim that the problems hindering its adoption have been solved, that its original goals as a distributed system, development environment, and research platform have been met, and that it enjoys moderate but growing popularity. Inferno, through its hosted capabilities, has been a vehicle for bringing Plan 9 technologies to other systems as a hosted part of heterogeneous computing grids.

Several projects work to extend Plan 9, including 9atom and 9front. These forks augment Plan 9 with additional hardware drivers and software, including an improved version of the Upas e-mail system, the Go compiler, Mercurial version control system support (and now also a git implementation), and other programs. Plan 9 was ported to the Raspberry Pi single-board computer. The Harvey project attempts to replace the custom Plan 9 C compiler with GCC, to leverage modern development tools such as GitHub and Coverity, and speed up development.

Since Windows 10 version 1903, the Windows Subsystem for Linux implements the Plan 9 Filesystem Protocol as a server and the host Windows operating system acts as a client.

Derivatives and forks 
Inferno is a descendant of Plan 9, and shares many design concepts and even source code in the kernel, particularly around devices and the Styx/9P2000 protocol.
Inferno shares with Plan 9 the Unix heritage from Bell Labs and the Unix philosophy. Many of the command line tools in Inferno were Plan 9 tools that were translated to Limbo.

 9atom augments the Plan 9 distribution with the addition of a 386 PAE kernel, an amd64 cpu and terminal kernel, nupas, extra pc hardware support, IL and Ken's fs.
 9front is a fork of Plan 9. It was started to remedy a perceived lack of devoted development resources inside Bell Labs, and has accumulated various fixes and improvements.
 9legacy is an alternative distribution. It includes a set of patches based on the current Plan 9 distribution.
 Akaros is designed for many-core architectures and large-scale SMP systems.
 Harvey OS is an effort to get the Plan 9 code working with gcc and clang.
 JehanneOS is an experimental OS derived from Plan 9. Its userland and modules are mostly derived from 9front, its build system from Harvey OS, and its kernel is a fork of the Plan9-9k 64-bit Plan9 kernel.
 NIX is a fork of Plan9 aimed at multicore systems and cloud computing.
 node9 is a scripted derivative of Plan9/Inferno that replaces the Limbo programming language and DIS virtual machine with the Lua language and LuaJit virtual machine. It also replaces the Inferno per-platform hosted I/O with Node.js' libuv eventing and I/O for consistent, cross-platform hosting. It's a proof-of-concept that demonstrates that a distributed OS can be constructed from per-process namespaces and generic cloud elements to construct a single-system-image of arbitrary size.
 Plan B designed to work in distributed environments where the set of available resources is different at different points in time.

License 
Starting with the release of Fourth edition in April 2002, the full source code of Plan 9 from Bell Labs is freely available under Lucent Public License 1.02, which is considered to be an open-source license by the Open Source Initiative (OSI), free software license by the Free Software Foundation, and it passes the Debian Free Software Guidelines.

In February 2014, the University of California, Berkeley, was authorized by the current Plan 9 copyright holder – Alcatel-Lucent – to release all Plan 9 software previously governed by the Lucent Public License, Version 1.02 under the GPL-2.0-only.

On March 23, 2021, ownership of Plan 9 transferred from Bell Labs to the Plan 9 Foundation, and all previous releases have been relicensed to the MIT License.

See also 

 Alef (programming language)
 Rendezvous (Plan 9)
 Inferno (operating system)
 Minix
 HelenOS

References

External links 

 9p.io:  Archived mirror of the original official Plan 9 Web site at plan9.bell-labs.com 
 9fans:  Semi-official mailing list for Plan 9 users and developers
 Plan 9 Foundation

 
1992 software
ARM operating systems
Computing platforms
Distributed computing architecture
Embedded operating systems
Free software operating systems
Operating system distributions bootable from read-only media
Software projects
PowerPC operating systems
MIPS operating systems
X86-64 operating systems
X86 operating systems